Rainbow Falls is a perennial plunge waterfall located near Harrison Lake, British Columbia, Canada. The falls can be viewed with difficulty from a bridge on the unpaved logging road below.

References 

Waterfalls of British Columbia
Yale Division Yale Land District